The Environs of Aden (French: Les Environs d'Aden) is a 1940 adventure novel by the French writer Pierre Benoit.

Film adaptation
In 1956 it was turned into a film It Happened in Aden starring Dany Robin and Jacques Dacqmine.

References

Bibliography
 Goble, Alan. The Complete Index to Literary Sources in Film. Walter de Gruyter, 1999.
 Engler, Winfried. The French Novel, from Eighteen Hundred to the Present. Ungar, 1969.

1940 novels
Novels by Pierre Benoit 
French novels adapted into films
Novels set in the Middle East
Éditions Albin Michel books